Sussex Shores is an unincorporated community in Sussex County, Delaware, United States. Sussex Shores is located along the Atlantic Ocean and Delaware Route 1, north of Bethany Beach and south of Delaware Seashore State Park. Sussex Shores was built in the 1950s and was the first of several developments built to the north of Bethany Beach.

References

Unincorporated communities in Sussex County, Delaware
Unincorporated communities in Delaware